The Giga Pearl holds the record as the largest certified non-nacreous pearl in the world. The pearl weighs in at 27.65 kg (60-lb 15-oz) and measures 39.37 cm (15.5 in) x 22.86 cm (9 in) x 20.95 cm (8.25 in), which is four times larger than the Pearl of Lao Tzu (formerly the Pearl of Allah) which weighs 6.4 kg.   There have been claims of "the world's largest pearl" in recent years, however, only the Giga Pearl holds the title on record as the worlds largest GIA (Gemological Institute of America) certified natural blister pearl, making it indisputably the largest in the world.

Origin 
The Giga Pearl is owned by Abraham Reyes, a natural pearl and antiquities collector in Canada. Reyes comes from the rank of avid collectors. His great aunt, who is in her late 90s, is a major collector of Asian artifacts in the Philippines. The pearl was given to his great aunt by his grandfather who came to visit her in Manila and brought a giant clam as a gift or pasalubong, a custom in Filipino culture.

The Giga Pearl was formed by a Tridacna gigas which is the largest mollusc in the fossil record. These giant clams can grow up to approximately four and a half feet (1.3 m) wide and can weigh up to approximately 550 pounds (250 kg). They are found in the eastern Indian Ocean and west Pacific Ocean, from Thailand and western Australia eastward to Micronesia.

Value 
The Giga Pearl is reported to be worth $60–$200 million USD. The pearl is currently being displayed in an octopus sculpture gilded in 22k gold by artist Bethany Krull.

References 

Pearls
Gemology
Jewellery